Aruba Airlines (legally ) is the flag carrier and the sole airline of Aruba. The airline, founded in 2006, providing scheduled and charter air transport for passengers to 13 destinations. Aruba Airlines's corporate headquarters is in Oranjestad, Aruba. Aruba operates its primary maintenance base at Miami. They received an AOC from the United States in 2015.

History
Aruba Airlines was established by Mr. Onno J. de Swart in 2006. The airline began charter operations with a seven-seat Piper PA-31 Navajo in 2010. The main headquarters is in the city of Oranjestad in Aruba, which is the main operation centre, and the airline opened a new office at Queen Beatrix International Airport. It also has smaller offices in Miami, Curaçao, Bonaire and in Maracaibo, Valencia and Maracay.

In early 2012 the company attracted new investors, leading to the upgrade of operations to jet aircraft. The company received an economic air operator's certificate in August 2012. The airline then arranged to lease two Airbus A320 twin-engined 150-seat jet airliners; the first one arrived in Aruba in November 2012. The aircraft started to fly charter flights from Aruba at the end of 2012 and scheduled operations started on March 31, 2013, with Maracaibo, Venezuela as its initial destination. Flights to Panama City, Panama began on July 5 of that year.

Aruba Airlines had also started flying between Aruba to Curaçao and Santo Domingo in December 2015, operating with the Airbus A320. In May 2016, it was announced that the Curaçao-Santo Domingo flight as well as Panama would be temporarily suspended and that operations would resume soon when able, although no reason was given for this. In July 2016, the airline celebrated the signing of their fourth aircraft, with its first Airbus A319. The aircraft was delivered to Aruba Airlines in December 2016.

Aruba Airlines announced on October 2, 2017, that it will be re-introducing service to Curaçao and introducing new service to Bonaire. The flights would be operated with a Dash 8-300 that was signed for in September 2017 and that service to Curaçao would begin on October 23, 2017, with Bonaire's date to be announced. Unfortunately the first flight was cancelled due to the Dash 8 aircraft not being delivered on time and the airline officially commenced service to Curaçao on October 25, 2017, utilizing a Bombardier CRJ200, leased from Voyageur Airways, that was previously used to fly between Curaçao and Sint Maarten after the aftermath of Hurricane Irma.

A press conference held live in Curaçao on October 27, 2017, Francisco Arendsz, the airlines' accountable manager stated that the airline had planned to order an additional Dash 8-100, along with the original aircraft that was expected to be delivered as back up. This would be when they revealed the original aircraft was not ready. The current plan is temporarily using the leased CRJ200. The second CRJ200 will be delivered, wearing the company's official livery. Bonaire is planned to commence on 16 November 2017, if Aruba Airlines is permitted by Dutch Civil Aviation Authority. Additional destinations planned for November include, Barquisimeto and Punto Fijo. The press conference also reflected on the future of the airline, including destinations planned for 2018, which include New York City, Argentina, and Bogotá. Flights to Argentina and New York are planned to be flown by an Airbus A330 that had supposedly been ordered recently. On 14 November 2017, the inaugural flight to Curaçao, the CEO stated that next year there would be additional 4 aircraft excluding the already ordered CRJ200 for next year.

Due to sanction made by the Venezuelan government in the first half of 2018, the fleet renewal will be announced near the end of the year.

Destinations

As of December 2021, Aruba Airlines flies to the following destinations:

Fleet

Current fleet
As of October 2022, the Aruba Airlines fleet consists of the following aircraft:

Former fleet

See also
List of airlines of Aruba

References

External links

Official website

Airlines of Aruba
Airlines established in 2006
2006 establishments in Aruba